This is a list of medalists at the European Open Water Swimming Championships.

In certain years, open water swimming was not part of the LEN European Aquatics Championships, or the European Aquatics Championships were not held that year. Instead a separate European Open Water Swimming Championships was held.

Men

5 km

10 km

25 km

Women

5 km

10 km

25 km

Mixed team

5 km

See also
European Open Water Swimming Championships
List of European Aquatics Championships medalists in open water swimming
List of World Aquatics Championships medalists in open water swimming

References

External links 
 Results MicroPlus Timing for LEN European Open Water Swimming Championships Hoorn 2016
 Results MicroPlus Timing for OpenWater European Championships 2018

European Open Water Swimming Championships